Stagecoach State Park is a Colorado State Park located in Routt County  south of Steamboat Springs, Colorado. The  park established in 1989 includes a  reservoir on the Yampa River formed by Stagecoach Dam. Park uplands are montane shrub communities, with riparian areas and wetlands around the reservoir and along the river. Commonly sighted wildlife includes elk, mule deer, coyote, red fox and badger.

References

State parks of Colorado
Protected areas of Routt County, Colorado
Protected areas established in 1965
1965 establishments in Colorado